Welcome to the Wasteland is the second album from Logan. Initially planned as just an EP, it grew in length and is now considered to be a full album. Track six, "Like A Rain", is a re-recorded version of the song from First Leaf Fallen, Logan's first album that has since been pulled out of circulation. The piano part on "Hey Mary" was played by Paul Gallagher, who had previously collaborated with Logan.

Track listing
"From The Moment I Wake..." – 3:59
"Gone..." – 4:25
"Time Has Come..." – 4:34
"Something Else..." – 3:12
"Show Me The Way..." – 4:47
"Like A Rain" – 5:09
"Hey Mary" – 4:34
"Feel Me" – 3:43

References 

Logan (band) albums
2005 albums